Shawnee State University (SSU) is a public university in Portsmouth, Ohio. Established in 1986, Shawnee State is an open admissions university. It is the southernmost member of the University System of Ohio.

History
Although its roots date  back to 1945, when Ohio University established an academic center in Portsmouth, the university was actually conceived in 1985 when Vern Riffe, the speaker of the Ohio House of Representatives, introduced legislation to create Shawnee State University. The legislation passed both Ohio houses and was signed into law by Governor Richard Celeste in 1986.

In 1987, the university's library was named a federal depository library.

In 1990, the university awarded its first bachelor's degrees, having been authorized by the state Regents to establish baccalaureate programs two years earlier. The university established its first master's degree program in 2000 and its second master's program (the Master of Education) in 2010.  It now also offers a Master of Science in Mathematical Sciences and a Master of Occupational Therapy.

In 2022, the university settled with a professor for $400,000 after he had previously been disciplined for refusing to use a transgender student's  pronouns and later sued the university in 2018 over First and Fourteenth Amendment violations. The professor had previously offered compromises to refuse using any titles or pronouns with the student and the university called the settlement an economic one, instead of admitting to any violation.

Academics

Shawnee State University has more than 70 associate, bachelor, and master's degree programs. The most popular majors are Nursing, Business Administration, Sociology, Early Education Studio Art, Biology, Fitness Administration, and Psychology.

The university offers an Honors Program
for exceptional students.
The Clark Memorial Library of Shawnee State is a charter member of the OhioLINK library consortium., giving faculty and students access to 46 million books and other items.

Financial aid

Shawnee State awards more than $25 million annually in financial aid.  Scholarships, grants, loans, and college work-study programs are available. In 2018, 94% of all SSU students received some form of financial aid.

International programs
To broaden the university's approach, SSU has student and faculty exchange programs with several overseas institutions, including the Jaume I University in Spain, Al Akhawayn University in Morocco, Zhejiang University of Technology in China, and the Ludwigsburg University of Education in Germany.

SSU offers summer study abroad programs in Greece, Great Britain, and Ireland, and other countries.  Some of these programs are funded by the Jim and Betty Hodgden Travel Fund

International students studying at Shawnee State represent 1% of the student population.

The university offers an "English as a Second Language Program" on campus for International Students.

Student demographics

Full-time-students are 90%, out-of-state students are 12%, female students are 54%, African American students are 5%, resident aliens are 1%, students living on campus are 26%, students in fraternities or sororities are 2%, and the average age for all students is 22 years.

Two students serve on the Shawnee State University Board of Trustees, the university's highest governing body.  The students serve two-year terms. They are appointed by the Governor's Office of Appointments in the state of Ohio.

Facilities

Shawnee State, located in downtown Portsmouth, has a 62-acre campus. Its 28 buildings  include the Vern Riffe Center for the Arts, Clark Planetarium, Morris University Center, and James A. Rhodes Athletic Center. The university's library was named the Clark Memorial Library in 1997.

Shawnee State University's Clyde W. Clark Planetarium opened in 1998. The Planetarium permanently displays the Hubble Space Telescope Viewspace system.

Funding for the planetarium was provided by Clyde W. Clark, a university donor, for whom the planetarium and library are named.

Housing and parking

The university has on-campus housing for 934 students. All first-year students must live in university housing unless they are married, veterans, over age 23, or living with their parents.

Parking on campus is free, and students living in university housing may have cars.

Athletics

The Shawnee State athletic teams are called the Bears. The university is a member of the National Association of Intercollegiate Athletics (NAIA), primarily competing in the Mid-South Conference (MSC) since the 2010–11 academic year. The Bears previously competed in the defunct American Mideast Conference (AMC) from 1991–92 to 2009–10; and as an NAIA Independent from 1986–87 (when the school began its athletics program and joined the NAIA) to 1990–91.

Shawnee State competes in 13 intercollegiate varsity sports: Men's sports include baseball, basketball, cross country, golf, soccer and track & field (outdoor); while women's sports include basketball, cross country, soccer, softball, tennis, track & field (outdoor) and volleyball. Former sports included men's tennis.

Organizations

Shawnee State has two sororities on campus, Theta Phi Alpha and Delta Phi Epsilon, and two fraternities, Tau Kappa Epsilon and Phi Mu Delta.

Clubs on campus include Art Club, Chemistry Club, Fantanime, Geology Club, History Club, International Game Developer's Association (IGDA), Political Science Club, Pre-Med Club, and Sexuality and Gender Acceptance (SAGA). and an international group, the Other World Society.

Notable people
 Candice Cassidy – June 2009 Playboy Playmate of the Month, alumna (BS, psychology)
 Ted Strickland – former governor of Ohio and U.S. Representative, served as assistant professor at the university before entering politics
 Lavanya Vemsani – Distinguished Professor of History and Religious Studies, author, Vice President of the Ohio Academy of History and member of the Council on Foreign Relations.

References

External links
 Official website
 Official athletics website

 
Public universities and colleges in Ohio
Educational institutions established in 1986
Education in Scioto County, Ohio
Buildings and structures in Scioto County, Ohio
Tourist attractions in Scioto County, Ohio
1986 establishments in Ohio
Portsmouth, Ohio